For the 2003 ISSF World Cup in the seventeen Olympic shooting events, the World Cup Final was held in October 2003 in Milan, Italy for the rifle, pistol and running target events, and in Rome, Italy for the shotgun events.

Rifle, pistol and running target
The winners in Milan were:
  Rajmond Debevec, Slovenia, in men's 50 m Rifle Three Positions
  Torben Grimmel, Denmark, in men's 50 m Rifle Prone
  Péter Sidi, Hungary, in men's 10 m Air Rifle
  Xu Dan, China, in men's 50 m Pistol
  Marco Spangenberg, Germany, in men's 25 m Rapid Fire Pistol
  Mikhail Nestruev, Russia, in men's 10 m Air Pistol
  Li Jie, China, in men's 10 m Running Target
  Lioubov Galkina, Russia, in women's 50 m Rifle Three Positions
  Anjali Bhagwat, India, in women's 10 m Air Rifle
  Chen Ying, China, in women's 25 m Pistol
  Olena Kostevych, Ukraine, in women's 10 m Air Pistol

Shotgun
The winners in Rome were:
  Giovanni Pellielo, Italy, in men's Trap
  Ahmed Al Maktoum, United Arab Emirates, in men's Double Trap
  Ennio Falco, Italy, in men's Skeet
  Gao E, China, in women's Trap
  Li Qingnian, China, in women's Double Trap
  Svetlana Demina, Russia, in women's Skeet

ISSF World Cup
World Cup
Shooting
Shooting
2000s in Milan
2000s in Rome
Sports competitions in Milan
Sports competitions in Rome
Shooting competitions in Italy
October 2003 sports events in Europe